North Dublin Eagles are an Irish rugby league team from Dublin, Ireland. The team is based in Raheny on Northside Dublin. The Eagles play their home games at ALSAA and train on Tuesdays and Thursdays at St. Paul's College, Raheny.

See also

 Rugby league in Ireland
 List of rugby league competitions

References

External links 

Irish rugby league teams
Rugby league teams in County Dublin
Raheny